David Nuriev, stage name  Ptaha (Птаха "little bird" in Russian)  is a Russian hip hop artist.  Ptaha is a former member of the hip hop group Centr.

Discography
2007 - The Trail of Emptiness
2009 - "About Nothing"
2010 - Cigarettes
2012 - Old Secrets
2014 - "On Nizam"
2015 - Fitovoy
2016 - "Bouncy"
2017 - For Peace

References

See also
Russian hip hop

Living people
Russian hip hop musicians
Russian people of Azerbaijani descent
People from Baku
1981 births

ru:Птаха (рэпер)